India participated in the 1962 Asian Games held in the city of Jakarta, Indonesia from 24 August 1962 to 4 September 1962. India ranked 3rd with 12 gold medals in this edition of the Asiad.

Medals by sport

References

Nations at the 1962 Asian Games
1962
Asian Games